Tint Hsan (also spelt Tint San; born 14 September 1956) was the Minister for Sports from 2011 to 2016. He owns A.C.E. Group of Companies, a major Burmese construction company.

Career

MP
In 2010 general election, Tint Hsan was elected as MP for Pyithu Hluttaw from Myaung Mya Township of Ayeyarwady Region.

Union Minister
On 30 March 2011, he was appointed as Union Minister for Ministry of Sports and Ministry of Hotels and Tourism. He was in charge of two ministries. In August 2012, he only handled Sports. Minister for Hotels and Tourism was replaced by Htay Aung.

He took over the flag of SEAGF in the closing ceremony of 2011 SEA Games in Indonesia. His biggest achievement as the minister of Sports was hosting the SEA Games. He served as the chairman of the Organization Committee for the 27th SEA Games and the 7th ASEAN Para Games.

Personal life
On 15 October 2017, Phyo Ko Ko Tint San (b. 1976), Tint Hsan's son, who serves as the chairman of A.C.E. Group, was arrested for possession of narcotics (methamphetamines and crystal meth) and multiple firearms and ammunition at Nay Pyi Taw International Airport. Additional raids at the ACE Hotel in Naypyidaw, his homes in Naypyidaw and Yangon, and the Yangon ACE Group offices yielded additional ammunition and pistols. In 2017, Tint Hsan's younger son, San Ko Ko Tint San, co-founded 7th Sense Creation, a major film studio in Myanmar.

References

Government ministers of Myanmar
Living people
Burmese businesspeople
1956 births
Sports ministers
Union Solidarity and Development Party politicians